Albania has an embassy in Brasília, and Brazil has an embassy in Tirana.

History 

Diplomatic ties were established between Albania and Brazil in 1961. In 2000, the then-foreign Minister of Albania Paskal Milo visited Brasília.

In 2013, Brazil opened its resident diplomatic mission in Tirana, while Albania has had an embassy in Brasilia since 2009.

Cooperation 

There exists a Cultural Association and also a Chamber of Commerce and Industry 'Brazil-Albania'.

On June 20, 2012 the Prime Minister of Albania, Sali Berisha visited Brazil during an official trip to attend the Rio 20 Summit, while prior to that the Foreign Minister of Albania, Edmond Haxhinasto visited Brazil. The Foreign Minister was received by Michel Temer, than Vice President of Brazil and Senator Fernando Collor de Mello. A bilateral agreement was signed by both countries in future economic cooperation and also a visa abolition agreement. Since 2011 citizens of both countries can travel visa-free.

In March, 2012, the Brazilian Minister of Agriculture, Livestock, and Supply, Mendes Ribeiro visited Tirana and a bilateral agreement on agricultural cooperation was signed.

High level visits

See also 
 Foreign relations of Albania
 Foreign relations of Brazil

External links 
 Albanian Embassy in Brasília
 Brazilian Embassy in Tirana

References 

 
Brazil
Bilateral relations of Brazil